Justice Banks may refer to:

Fred L. Banks Jr. (born 1942), associate justice of the Supreme Court of Mississippi
John W. Banks (1867–1958), associate justice of the Connecticut Supreme Court